G7 and (from 1997 to 2014) G8 ministerial meetings are meetings of the government ministers of the G7 and G8 countries. G7 summit meetings originated in an ad hoc gathering of finance ministers in 1973.

Meetings of finance ministers, labour and employment ministers, environment ministers, foreign ministers and trade ministers and other ad hoc ministerial meetings  have taken place within the country designated for the annual G7 or G8 summit. As of 2021, seven G7 "Ministerial Tracks" cover economic, environmental, health, trade, technology, development and foreign policy issues.

Digital technology ministers
The digital technology ministers of the G7 countries met in Paris on 15 May 2019, during the French G7 presidency. Ministers from India, Australia, New Zealand and Chile and representatives of the OECD, International Telecommunication Union (ITU) and UNESCO also attended. A draft of the Charter for an Open, Free and Safe Internet was discussed at the meeting. This was subsequently signed by six of the G7 members, but not by the United States.

Energy ministers
The G7 Kitakyushu Energy Ministerial Meeting took place in Kitakyushu, Japan on 1–2 May 2016.

Health ministers
G7 Health ministers met in June  and November 2021. The latter was an urgent meeting called by the U.K. presidency to discuss developments relating to the spread of the Omicron COVID-19 variant.

Labour and employment ministers
From 11-13 May 2008, in advance of the G8 summit in Tōyako, Hokkaido in July 2008, the Labour and Employment Ministers of the G8 countries and the EU Commissioner for Employment, Social Affairs and Equal Opportunities held a ministerial meeting in Niigata, Japan. With the additional participation of the Director-General of the ILO (Juan Somavía) and the Secretary-General of the OECD (Ángel Gurría), and Labour Ministers from Indonesia and Thailand invited as guests, the aim of the meeting was to discuss "the best balance for a resilient and sustainable society".

Three themes were addressed:
Enabling Well-Balanced Lives in Harmony with Increased Longevity (individual level) 
The Contribution of Labour Market and Employment Policies to Addressing the Needs of Vulnerable Workers and Areas (society level) 
The Contribution of the G8 Members to the Challenges to Global Sustainability (global society level).

As a result of these discussions a principle referred to as the "Niigata Global-Balance Principle" was adopted, which set out a recognition that:

Trade ministers
The G7 trade ministers held their first meeting on 31 March 2021.

References

External links
University of Toronto, G7 Research Group, G7/8 Ministerial Meetings and Documents

G7 summits
Global economic conferences